Brodie Murdoch (born 21 January 1994) is a former professional Australian rules footballer who played for the St Kilda Football Club in the Australian Football League (AFL). He was recruited by the club in the 2012 National Draft from SANFL club Glenelg, with pick 40. His original country club is Port MacDonnell in the Southeast of SA. Murdoch made his debut in Round 5, 2013, against  at Westpac Stadium in Wellington NZ. At the conclusion of the 2016 season, he was delisted by St Kilda. He went on to win consecutive premierships with Port Melbourne in the VFL (2017) and Southport in the NEAFL (2018).

References

External links

1994 births
Living people
St Kilda Football Club players
Australian rules footballers from South Australia
Glenelg Football Club players
Sandringham Football Club players
Port Melbourne Football Club players
Southport Australian Football Club players